Shmaryahu Levin (born 1867 in Svislach, Minsk Governorate; died 9 June 1935, Haifa), was a Jewish Zionist activist. He was a member of the first elected Russian Parliament for the Constitutional Democratic Party in 1906.

Biography
Shmaryahu Levin served as a crown rabbi in the towns of Grodno (189697) and Ekaterinoslav (Dnipropetrovsk) from 1898 to 1904.

He was elected to the 1906 First Duma.
Levin left Russia for Germany immediately after the dispersal of the First Duma, then emigrated to America. From 1908 he began advocating for the creation of the Haifa Technion. He was known as an outstanding Yiddish orator.

Zionist activism
Levin was a representative of the World Zionist Organization and director of the Information Department of Keren Hayesod.

Awards and recognition

Kfar Shmaryahu, an affluent Tel Aviv suburb, is named for him.

References

External links

Central Zionist Archives Personal papers of  Shmaryahu Levin. The notation of the record group is A20.

1867 births
1935 deaths
People from Puchavičy District
People from Bobruysky Uyezd
Belarusian Jews
Russian Constitutional Democratic Party members
Members of the 1st State Duma of the Russian Empire
Jewish activists
Jewish philanthropists
Belarusian Zionists
Ashkenazi Jews in Mandatory Palestine
Burials at Trumpeldor Cemetery
Hochschule für die Wissenschaft des Judentums alumni